Portosín is a town of northwestern Spain in the province of A Coruña, in the autonomous community of Galicia. It belongs to the comarca of Noia and municipality of Porto do Son.

References 

Municipalities in the Province of A Coruña